Memoright is a Taiwan based storage products house founded in March 2006. 
It produced a 2.5inch SSD (Solid State Disk) with a claimed read/write speed of 100Mbit/s, the fastest SSD available at the time. 
It has since delivered a number of disks with of increased performance, attracting press attention. 
Memoright presents itself as an engineering lead company, employing 80% masters graduates, although this is typical of a fabless research unit. 
Initially targeting the commodity markets of high end gaming and high query volume server infrastructure, Memoright has released advertising that appears aimed towards Military and Aerospace customers with challenging deployment environments.

Besides military grade SSDs, it launched the embedded system SSD (2.5" SLC/MLC SSD, mSATA/mPCIE SSD, SATA/IDE DOM, wide temp CF/SD card) and commercial/consumer grade SSDs since 2010.

Memoright has a distribution arrangement with First Commercial Technologies, Inc.

References

External links 
www.memoright.com

Companies based in New Taipei
Computer storage companies
Taiwanese brands